Amaker is a surname. Notable people with the surname include:

Brent Amaker, American singer
Marcus Amaker (born 1976), American poet
Tommy Amaker (born 1965), American basketball player and coach

See also
Amacher